Monsef Derraji (born August 1976) is a Canadian politician, who was elected to the National Assembly of Quebec in the 2018 provincial election. He represents the electoral district of Nelligan as a member of the Quebec Liberal Party.

References

1976 births
Living people
Businesspeople from Montreal
Moroccan emigrants to Canada
People from Marrakesh
Quebec Liberal Party MNAs
21st-century Canadian politicians
Politicians from Montreal
Université Laval alumni
Université de Montréal alumni